The Pyramid of Tirana is a structure and former museum located in Tirana, the capital of Albania. It opened as a museum in 1988 and became a conference center in 1991 following the collapse of Communism. During the 1999 Kosovo War, the building was used as a NATO base. In 2018, a new project was unveiled that would open for Creative Technologies under the name of TUMO Center turning the Pyramid into an IT center for youth with a focus on computer programming, robotics, and start ups.

Background 

On 14 October 1988, the structure opened as the Enver Hoxha Museum, originally serving as a museum about the legacy of Enver Hoxha, the long-time leader of Communist Albania, who had died three years earlier. The structure was co-designed by Hoxha's daughter Pranvera Hoxha, an architect, and her husband Klement Kolaneci, along with Pirro Vaso and Vladimir Bregu.

When built, the Pyramid was said to be the most expensive individual structure ever constructed in Albania.

The Pyramid has sometimes been sardonically called the "Enver Hoxha Mausoleum", although this was never its intended use or official appellation.

Post-Communism

After 1991, following the collapse of Communism, the Pyramid ceased its function as a museum and for several years was repurposed as a conference center and exhibition venue, as well as being rebranded with its current name. During the 1999 Kosovo War, the former museum was used as a base by NATO and humanitarian organizations.

Since 2001, part of the Pyramid has been used as broadcasting center by Albanian media outlets Top Channel and Top Albania Radio, while the rest of the structure and the paved surrounding area (currently being used as a parking lot and bus station for minivans to Elbasan) have experienced dilapidation and vandalism.

Part of Armando Lulaj's film It Wears as it Grows (2011) was shot inside the Pyramid. In 2019, the Pyramid was also used as a filming location for part of a remake of the 1995 cult horror film Castle Freak.

Possible demolition 
Numerous proposals to demolish the Pyramid and to redevelop the land of the  complex for alternative uses have been made, with the most prominent proposal being the potential construction of a new Albanian parliament building on the site.

A previous proposal for the site to become a new opera theater was approved but cancelled shortly after construction work began. The exterior marble tiles covering the structure were removed to a depot outside of Tirana. The proposed demolition of the Pyramid itself became a point of controversy among some leading foreign architects, who have both supported and opposed it. Historian Ardian Klosi initiated a petition against the demolition of the structure, gathering around 6000 signatures. A study published in 2015 but undertaken in 2013 suggests that the majority of citizens of Tirana were against the demolition.

It was announced in 2017 that the Pyramid will not be demolished, but refurbished.

Youth IT Center

In 2018, a new project was unveiled that would turn the Pyramid into an IT center for youth called TUMO Tirana, with a focus on computer programming, robotics, and start ups. The project consists in building staircases on the sides of the pyramid, and glass coverage areas for increased natural light.

See also
Enver Hoxha
The Pyramid (Kadare novel)
Tumo Center for Creative Technologies

References

External links 

Pyramid of Tirana Technology Center Official Project by MVRDV
TUMO Tirana Official Webpage
 Музей Энвера Ходжа в Тиране 

Buildings and structures in Tirana
Monuments and memorials in Albania
Pyramids in Europe
Enver Hoxha
Buildings and structures completed in 1988
1988 establishments in Albania